Malaysia will participate at the 2022 Asian Games in Hangzhou, China from 10 to 25 September 2022.

Preparations
Dato' Chong Kim Fatt, President of the Wushu Federation of Malaysia (WFM), was appointed as the chef-de-mission of the delegation on 25 September 2021 during the 198th Olympic Council of Malaysia (OCM) Executive Council meeting which was held on virtual basis.

On 29 December 2021, the OCM Selection Committee under the Chairmanship of OCM President Tan Sri Dato’ Sri Norza Zakaria held a meeting to discuss the selection criteria for the 2022 Asian Games and decided that:

 For Category A, athletes and teams will have to be in the top 4;
 For Category B, athletes and teams will have to be in the top 8 (reduced from top 16 due to tightened criteria); And,
 The Committee will utilise competitions from 2018 to May 2022, including 2021 Southeast Asian Games as basis for selection.

Field hockey

Summary

Men's tournament

Women's tournament

References

Nations at the 2022 Asian Games
2022
2022 in Malaysian sport